The 2011 Tour de Langkawi was the 16th edition of the Tour de Langkawi, a cycling stage race that took place in Malaysia. It began on 23 January in Dataran Lang, Langkawi and ended on 1 February in Dataran Merdeka, Kuala Lumpur. The race was sanctioned by the Union Cycliste Internationale (UCI) as a 2.HC (hors category) race on the 2010–11 UCI Asia Tour calendar.

Venezuela's Jonathan Monsalve won the race followed by Colombian cyclist, Libardo Niño second and Italian cyclist Emanuele Sella third. Italian cyclist, Andrea Guardini won the points classification and Jonathan Monsalve became the King of the Mountains of the race.  led the teams classification of the race.

Teams
23 teams accepted invitations to participate in the 2011 Tour de Langkawi.

 
 
 
 
 Suren Cycling Team
 
 
 
 
 South Korea ‡
 Malaysia ‡
 
 
 Singapore ‡
 
 
 
 
 
 
 
 
 Max Success Sports

‡: National teams

Stages

The cyclists competed in 10 stages, covering a distance of 1,315.4 kilometres.

Classification leadership

Final standings

General classification

Points classification

Mountains classification

Asian rider classification

Team classification

Asian team classification

Stage results

Stage 1
23 January 2011 — Dataran Lang to Pekan Kuah,

Stage 2
24 January  2011 — Kangar to Butterworth,

Stage 3
25 January  2011 — Taiping to Sitiawan,

Stage 4
26 January 2011 — Ayer Tawar to Cameron Highlands,

Stage 5
27 January 2011 — Tapah to Genting Highlands,

Stage 6 
28 January 2011 — Rawang to Putrajaya,

Stage 7
29 January 2011 — Banting to Tampin,

Stage 8 
30 January 2011 — Kuala Pilah to Jasin,

Stage 9
31 January 2011 — Malacca to Nilai,

Stage 10 
1 February 2011 — Shah Alam to Dataran Merdeka,

References

External links
 

Tour de Langkawi
2011 in road cycling
2011 in Malaysian sport